This is a list of active volcanoes in the Philippines, as categorized by the Philippine Institute of Volcanology and Seismology (PHIVOLCS). Volcanoes in the country have erupted within the last 600 years, with accounts of these eruptions documented by humans; or have erupted within the last 10,000 years (Holocene). 

As of 2018, PHIVOLCS has listed 24 volcanoes as active in the Philippines, 21 of which have had historical eruptions. The three exceptions are Cabalian, which is a strongly fumarolic volcano; Leonard Kniaseff, which was active 1,800 years ago (C14), and Isarog, which last erupted around 3500 BCE and 2374 BCE ± 87 based on radiocarbon dating

There are 100 volcanoes in the Philippines listed by the Smithsonian Institution's Global Volcanism Program (GVP) at present, of which 20 are categorized as "historical" and 59 as "Holocene". The GVP lists volcanoes with historical, Holocene eruptions, or possibly older if strong signs of volcanism are still evident through thermal features like fumaroles, hot springs, mud pots, etc.

List of volcanoes 

The list below showing 27 active volcanoes in the Philippines was based on the PHIVOLCS list with some included from the GVP. The number is not definite and depends on someone's definition of "active" or historical time frame. Descriptions under "eruptions" were based on the GVP website. The frequency of historical eruptions excludes questionable or uncertain accounts based on the two sources mentioned.

Gallery

See also 
 List of potentially active volcanoes in the Philippines
 List of inactive volcanoes in the Philippines
 List of mountains in the Philippines

References

External links

 PHIVOLCS Volcano Monitoring and Classification of Volcanoes

 
Philippines, active
Volcanoes
active
Volcanism of the Philippines